Krishanu Dey (14 February 1962 – 20 March 2003) was an Indian footballer from Kolkata, India. He was an attacking midfielder and was known as the "Indian Maradona" among his fans due to his footballing skills and playing style.

He appeared with Calcutta Football League club East Bengal from 1984 to 1991 and again from 1992 to 1994, and captained the team in 1989–90. During his playing days, Dey came in touch of Sushil Bhattacharya, East Bengal's first ever head coach.

Club career
Krishanu began his professional career in the Calcutta Football League with Police A.C. in 1979 under Achyut Banerjee. He later shifted to Calcutta Port Trust in 1980. After spending a couple of seasons there, he joined Mohun Bagan in 1982. He played for Mohun Bagan until 1984. In 1982, he scored a debut goal against Dempo Sports Club in the Strafford Cup. After a series of attempts from Ex-East Bengal recruiter Dipak (Poltu) Das he joined their arch-rival East Bengal Club in 1985 along with Bikash Panji and became an East Bengal legend. It was during his time in East Bengal, that made him known as the "Indian Maradona".

He was part of the team that won Federation Cup in 1985 and appeared in qualifiers of 1985–86 Asian Club Championship in Saudi Arabia. During his days in mid-1980s, the club was managed by legendary footballer and Olympian P. K. Banerjee. In the Central Asia Zone (tournament named "Coca-Cola Cup"), they beat multiple foreign teams like New Road Team of Nepal, Abahani Krira Chakra of Bangladesh, Club Valencia of the Maldives, and won the Coca Cola Trophy.

He played for East Bengal continuously for a period of 7 years where he won many accolades including a treble (Durand Cup, Rovers Cup, IFA Shield) in 1990. He played for the club under coaching of Syed Nayeemuddin. He returned to Mohun Bagan in 1992, and played alongside Nigerian striker Chima Okorie, one of the best foreigners of the club. Krishanu again returned to East Bengal in 1994 for a season before joining his employer Food Corporation of India's football team in 1995. He played for them until his retirement in 1997. He was one of the highest paid Indian footballers of eighties and along with his close friend and fellow midfielder Bikash Panji with whom he formed a lethal combination on the field. His club transfer stories throughout the eighties and early nineties are very intriguing where the club dropped down to the level of crime to acquire his signature.

International career
Krishanu made his senior international debut for India on 22 June 1984 in the Great Wall Cup against China. Krishanu represented India in 10 list 'A' matches and scored 7 goals including a hat-trick at the Merdeka Tournament against Thailand in Malaysia, 1986. He was the fifth Indian and second Bengali after Subhas Bhoumik to score an international hat-trick for India. He took part in Asian Games (1986), Merdeka Cup, Pre-Olympics, SAFF Games and Asian Cup as a member of the Indian team. He was the captain of the Indian team in 1992 Asian Cup qualifiers.

Managerial career
After his retirement in 1997, Dey went on to choose managerial career and coached Food Corporation of India FC. He later managed Calcutta Football League outfit Kalighat Club in the 2000s.

Personal life
He lived in Naktala, a south Kolkata neighbourhood. In his childhood, Krishanu used to play cricket and hated playing football as it is a more physical game. After realizing his talent in football he started taking the sport more seriously. He married a girl from Naktala on 8 February 1988 and on 25 December 1990, he and his wife were blessed with a son. He died on 20 March 2003 following a pulmonary disorder and multi-organ failure in a Kolkata hospital. He is survived by his wife Sharmila 'Poni' Dey and a son Soham Dey, who is sports journalist in a leading newspaper in Kolkata. He has a Statue in his honor near Patuli Area in Kolkata. The Indian Football Association has named their under-19 football league in his memory.

In popular culture
A web series based on Dey, named Krishanu Krishanu, was released on 29 August 2019 on ZEE5, starring Anirban Chakrabarti, Elena Kazan, Badshah Moitra.

Honours
Mohun Bagan
Federation Cup: 1982
Durand Cup: 1982, 1984
IFA Shield: 1982
Calcutta Football League: 1983, 1984

East Bengal
Federation Cup: 1985
IFA Shield: 1984, 1986, 1990, 1991, 1994
Durand Cup: 1989, 1990, 1991, 1993
Calcutta Football League: 1985, 1987, 1988, 1989, 1991, 1993
Rovers Cup: 1990, 1994
Coca Cola Cup: 1985
Bordoloi Trophy: 1992
All Airlines Gold Cup: 1987, 1988, 1990, 1992
Darjeeling Gold Cup: 1985
SSS Trophy: 1989, 1991
Sait Nagjee Trophy: 1986
Stafford Cup: 1986

Bengal
 Santosh Trophy: 1986

India
 South Asian Games Gold medal: 1985, 1987

See also
 List of India national football team captains
 List of East Bengal Club captains

References

Bibliography

 
 

Chattopadhyay, Hariprasad (2017). Mohun Bagan–East Bengal . Kolkata: Parul Prakashan.

External links

 
Krishanu Dey at PlaymakerStats
Profile at KolkataFootball
Article on Krishanu Dey

1962 births
2003 deaths
Footballers from Kolkata
Indian footballers
India international footballers
1984 AFC Asian Cup players
East Bengal Club players
Mohun Bagan AC players
Calcutta Football League players
Footballers at the 1986 Asian Games
Association football midfielders
Asian Games competitors for India
South Asian Games medalists in football
South Asian Games gold medalists for India